Club Veg (initially called The Morning After Show on Triple J) was an Australian radio show created and presented by the comedic duo Vic Davies and Mal Lees (with writing contributions in the early years from Stephen Quinn). They started on Triple J (1984–86), followed by a stint on 2SM (1986-1988) and then their first run on Triple M Sydney (1988–1994) which saw them hosting nights then breakfast, before leaving the station and Sydney for Triple M Perth (1994–95). After a few years apart, they returned together to Triple M Sydney again in 1998 and remained there until 2002.

A typical show featured "song parodies and comic sketches". The duo also released two albums, Members and Guests & Things (1988) and We Suck (2000). Each was nominated for an ARIA Award for Best Comedy Release in the relevant years. The show was cancelled at the end of 2002 and the duo split. In mid-2009 Davies was diagnosed with lung cancer and died of the disease on 7 November 2009, aged 55.

History
The duo started working together when Vic Davies (copywriter) and Mal Lees (then the afternoon announcer, music director) met at radio station, 2KA, Katoomba in the mid-1970s. Both were fans of The Beatles, Monty Python and thinking outside the box – and being told off for it. They then worked at 2WS, Sydney; writing and producing comedy for Mad Mel but realized that they had a great comedy partnership and could write better for themselves than for others. Armed with some tapes from 2WS, Lees called Marius Webb at Triple J and introduced Webb to a new form of radio comedy. It resulted in them being hired – they started with The Morning After Show in 1984.

While at Triple J, the duo also hosted a theme night at The Tivoli in George Street, Sydney and because their listeners referred to them as "The Vegies" (due to their zany, mock-vegetative presenting style) they called the nights, Club Veg. When their Saturday breakfast show was moved to drive time, The Morning After Show, name no longer fit and, as their listeners still referred to "The Vegies", they changed the name to Club Veg.

The duo parodied a number of people including radio presenter, John Laws, and Jack Jones (who sang the Love Boat theme). After 18 months rival station, 2SM, offered the Club Veg team the drive shift and soon after the breakfast slot, before Triple M Sydney poached them for the night time show late in 1987.

With Club Veg, Triple M introduced the first FM nightly countdown, "Rock Poll". Together with their FM talk back and comedy format it was a winning combination. It was this period when Club Veg recorded the highest 7 pm – 10 pm results in Australian radio history and on their second stint at Triple M Sydney (1998–99), Club Veg was the first show to break Laws' long reign over the 9am-12Noon slot, beating him twice.

Club Veg provided song parodies; surprise Live SFX; "Sucked In" calls; responses of being "Not too foul..." when listeners would call in and ask how they were, and (following a successful drive campaign for an Indian sauce brand) "Pataks" and Mal's nightly sunsets over Sydney. The show was awarded a 1987 New York Radio Comedy Award and the Australian Radio Award (later known as an ACRA) in 1990 for Best On-Air Team. At the ARIA Music Awards of 1989 their debut album, Members and Guests and Things was nominated for Best Comedy Release; their second album, We Suck, was nominated in the same category in 2000.

The partnership ended in 2002 after their contract was not renewed by Triple M Sydney. Lees continued with his career in radio, initially at C91.3. On 7 November 2009 Vic Davies died of lung cancer – he had been diagnosed six months earlier – he was 55 and was survived by his wife, four children and four grandchildren.

Radio Shows

 Triple J – 1984 to 1986
 2SM – 1986 to 1988
 Triple M Sydney – 1988 to 1994
 Triple M Perth – 1994 to 1995
 Triple M Sydney – 1998 to 2002

Discography

Studio albums

Awards and nominations

ARIA Music Awards
The ARIA Music Awards is an annual awards ceremony that recognises excellence, innovation, and achievement across all genres of Australian music. 

|-
| ARIA Music Awards of 1989
| Members and Guests & Things
| ARIA Award for Best Comedy Release
| 
|-
| ARIA Music Awards of 2000
| We Suck – The Best of Sucked in Calls
| ARIA Award for Best Comedy Release
| 
|-

See also

 List of Triple J presenters

References 

Australian comedy troupes
Australian comedy radio programs
Triple M presenters
Triple J announcers